The Meekerville Historic District is a  historic district in the Lakeview community of North Side, Chicago, Illinois.

NRHP history
The district was listed on the U.S. National Register of Historic Places on May 12, 2006. The listing was announced as the featured listing in the National Park Service's weekly list of May 19, 2006.

See also
National Register of Historic Places listings in North Side Chicago

Lakeview, Chicago

Gallery

References

Historic districts in Chicago
North Side, Chicago
Neighborhoods in Chicago
Houses on the National Register of Historic Places in Chicago
Historic districts on the National Register of Historic Places in Illinois